Banyumas (formerly spelt "Banjoemas") Regency is a regency in the southwestern part of Central Java province in Indonesia. Its capital is the town of Purwokerto, but that town no longer has a central administration and is split over four of the districts within the Regency, with a combined population of 230,235 as at mid 2021. The Regency covers an area of 1,327.59 km2, and had a population of 1,554,527 at the 2010 Census and 1,776,918 at the 2020 Census; the official estimate of population as at mid 2021 was 1,789,630.

The term Banyumasan is also used as an adjective referring to the culture, language and peoples of the wider Banyumas area, equivalent to the pre-independence Banyumas Residency. The language of Banyumasan is of Austronesian origin, and is usually considered to be a dialect of Javanese.

Administrative districts 
Banyumas Regency comprises twenty-seven districts (kecamatan), tabulated below with their areas and their populations at the 2010 Census and the 2020 Census, together with the official estimates as at mid 2021. The table also gives the location of the district administrative centres, and the number of administrative villages (rural desa and urban kelurahan) in each district.

The villages comprise 30 urban kelurahan (all 27 in the 4 Purwokerto Districts, plus 3 in Sumpiuh District) and 301 rural desa.

Tourism

Curug Cipendok is a waterfall 93 metres high, about 15 kilometres west of Purwokerto, 500 metres from the road through a walking trail. It is still natural and is easily accessible on a good road, although there is no public transportation yet. The area surrounding the location belongs to Perhutani, a Forest State Company. North of the capital of Purwokerto, Baturraden Resort features views from the slopes of Mount Slamet. And 8 km to Baturaden, there a Curug Cehenk, this is a waterfall 73 meters, there is an object to holiday.

Among the religious tourism sites in Banyumas is Saka Tunggal Mosque, established in 1871.

References

External links
Official site of Banyumas District Government  (in Indonesian)